The subtribe Axonyina is a group of beetles in the Broscini tribe of Carabidae (the ground beetles).

Description 
Axonyina has three genera:
 Axonya: 3 species.
 Broscodes: 1 species.
 Rawlinsius: 1 species.

References 

Insect subtribes